The 2008 Ball State Cardinals football team represented Ball State University in the Mid-American Conference during the 2008 NCAA Division I FBS football season.  Brady Hoke, in his sixth season at Ball State, was the head coach until December 15, when he resigned to become the head coach at San Diego State. He was succeeded by offensive coordinator Stan Parrish, who coached the team during the GMAC Bowl and beyond. The Cardinals' home games were played at Scheumann Stadium in Muncie, Indiana.

With a 12–0 record during the regular season, the Cardinals completed their first perfect regular season since 1949 and their first undefeated season in Mid-American Conference play since 1978. The Cardinals earned their first Mid-American Conference West Championship in program history. The Cardinals chance at perfection ended after an upset loss to Buffalo in the 2008 MAC Championship Game. Ball State concluded the season with a 45–13 loss to Tulsa in the 2009 GMAC Bowl. The game marked the first time in school history Ball State has played in a bowl game in back-to-back seasons.

Pre-season

Outlook
The Cardinals ended the 2007 season with a 7–6 overall record, the Mid-American Conference West Division Co-Championship and the program’s first bowl game in 11 seasons, losing to Rutgers 52–30 in the 2008 International Bowl. Ball State ranked in the top 35 nationally in 2007 in five different categories; turnover margin (4th), passing offense (22nd), passing efficiency (24th), net punting (29th) and total offense (31st). The quarterback of the Ball State offense was Nate Davis who threw for 30 touchdowns to just six interceptions in his 478 pass attempts. The Cardinals returned their starting receiving corps, which helped lead Ball State to be the #1 ranked passing offense in the Mid-American Conference. Wide receiver Dante Love produced nearly 1,400 receiving yards while adding 203 more rushing with eleven touchdowns in 2007. Love also led the Mid-American Conference in three categories; receptions per game (7.7), receiving yards per game (107.5) and all-purpose yards (207). Punter Chris Miller was third in the country in 2007 averaging 45.4 yards per punt last season and was considered to be an All-American candidate. The Cardinals also returned tight end Darius Hill. Considered to be the premier tight end in the Mid-American Conference, Hill averaged 71 yards per game and scored 11 touchdowns last season. Regarding the offensive line, Andre Ramsey, Dan Gerberry and Robert Brewster were each three-year starters that form a solid nucleus along the offensive line. Defensively, the Cardinals ranked just 106th in the nation in rush defense,  and allowed 432 yards and 28.3 points per game. The Cardinals did, however, returned eight defensive starters, including six letterman. Returning for the 2008 season were cornerbacks B.J. Hill and Trey Lewis, who both recorded five interceptions in 2007. Defensive end Brandon Crawford had eight sacks in the previous season and linebacker Bryant Haines recorded 125 tackles.

At the Mid-American Conference Football Media Preview in Detroit, the Ball State Cardinals were picked to finish second in the Mid-American Conference West Division behind Central Michigan. Central Michigan grabbed 29 of the 36 first-place votes with Ball State receiving five first-place votes and Western Michigan receiving two. Central Michigan totaled 207 points in the preseason poll, while the Cardinals tallied 168.

Recruiting

Coaching staff

Schedule

Game summaries

Northeastern

Nate Davis passed for 280 yards and three touchdowns as Ball State beat Northeastern 48–14 in the season opener for both teams. MiQuale Lewis had 11 carries for 95 yards and one touchdown as the Cardinals garnered 190 yards rushing. Ball State had 487 yards total offense. Davis’ two other touchdown passes were a 49-yard completion to Dante Love and an eight-yard pass to Darius Hill in the first half. He completed 21 of 24 passes with no interceptions. The Huskies were down 28–0 with 50 seconds left in the first half when Greg Abelli scored on a 20-yard run. The Cardinals quickly responded with a 25-yard field goal by Ian McGarvey to make it 31–7 at halftime. Ball State lengthened its lead after the break to 48–7 with a 27-yard pass from Davis to Daniel Ifft, a Cory Sykes six-yard run and another McGarvey field goal. Northeastern backup quarterback John Sperrazza, who completed six of seven passes for 82 yards, threw a pass to Conor Gilmartin-Donohue for a 10-yard touchdown with 38 seconds left in the game. Starter Anthony Orio completed 14 of 30 passes for 149 yards.

Navy

Nate Davis passed for 326 yards and four touchdowns, but it was the Cardinals’ defense that repeatedly came up with the big plays in the second half of a 35–23 victory over the Midshipmen. Davis passed for 215 yards in the first half, including touchdowns of 61 yards to Dante Love on the second play of the game and 30 yards to Briggs Orsbon late in the second quarter. Love, who tied a school record with his eleventh game of at least 100 yards receiving, also rushed for a touchdown and caught a go-ahead 8 yard touchdown pass from Davis midway through the third quarter. After Love’s second touchdown catch put Ball State ahead 28–23, Navy threatened to take the lead again late in the third period. Shun White, who set a Navy rushing record with 348 yards and three touchdowns in the previous week, was stopped at the 3 yard line, and quarterback Jarod Bryant, who ran for Navy’s first two touchdowns, was held for no gain on fourth down, giving the ball back to the Cardinals. Ball State then put the game out of reach with a 97-yard drive, scoring the clinching touchdown on a 35-yard pass from Davis to Darius Hill early in the final period. The game was nationally televised on ESPN and earned a 1.2 Nielsen rating, making it the best regular season national television rating for a Mid-American Conference home game since 2005.

Akron

MiQuale Lewis rushed for 154 yards and two touchdowns and Nate Davis passed for 300 yards and two more touchdowns to lead Ball State past Akron 41–24. Lewis carried 28 times and scored on runs of three and two yards. Davis completed 24 of 36 passes with one interception, throwing touchdown passes of 21 yards to Briggs Orsbon and 25 yards to Darius Hill. Chris Jacquemain completed 21 of 44 passes for 269 yards and a 13-yard touchdown pass to Andre Jones, but was also intercepted off four times, three of them by Sean Baker. With the score tied at 10 early in the second quarter, the Cardinals scored 21 points on Lewis’ two touchdown and Baker’s 33 yard return of a fumble. The victory marked the first time Ball State started the season 3–0 since 1988.

Indiana

MiQuale Lewis ran for 166 yards and four touchdowns, helping Ball State to a 42–20 victory over Indiana. It was the first time the Cardinals beat a BCS conference school. The victory also ended Indiana's 20 game winning streak against Mid-American Conference opponents, which dated to a September 24, 1977, loss against Miami (Ohio) when Lee Corso was coaching the Hoosiers. The Cardinals gained 463 yards in offense, scored 28 points in the first half and put the game away with two touchdown runs from Lewis in the fourth quarter. Indiana was led by Kellen Lewis, who ran for 148 yards and one touchdown and threw for 159 yards but was intercepted twice. Nate Davis was 16 of 25 for 239 yards and threw one touchdown pass. Both teams combining for nearly 500 total yards and two defensive touchdowns in the first half.

Dante Love injury
With 10:45 left in the first half, Dante Love, who entered the game leading the nation at 144.3 yards per game, caught a short pass and started to turn upfield when Indiana cornerback Chris Adkins jarred the ball loose with a big hit that led to an Indiana touchdown. Love stayed on the ground for several minutes before doctors rolled him onto a backboard and carted him off the field. School officials later issued a statement saying Love felt numbness and tingling while on the field. He was taken to Bloomington Hospital before being transferred to Methodist Hospital in Indianapolis for further evaluation. Love underwent a five-hour surgery for a cervical spine fracture and a spinal cord injury and had movement in his arms and legs after the procedure. On September 22, head coach Brady Hoke told reporters, "Due to the injury Dante sustained, his football career is expected to be over. He should have normal and healthy functions for the rest of his life. He touched a lot of lives, and he will continue to do so."

Kent State

Before the game, Ball State players wore red T-shirts with Love’s jersey number 86 on the front during warmups, and had stickers with the number on the back of their helmets. A “We Love Dante” sign was draped over the fence just past the north end zone and Love also was named an honorary captain. MiQuale Lewis opened the scoring with a two-yard touchdown run in the first quarter. Early in the second quarter, Nate Davis threw a pass to Myles Trempe for a 31-yard touchdown that gave the Cardinals a 14–0 lead. Kent State responded late in the quarter when quarterback Julian Edelman scored on a 12-yard run to cut Ball State’s lead to 14–7. Lewis scored his second touchdown on a one-yard run with 21 seconds left in the second quarter to give the Cardinals a 21–7 lead at halftime. Cory Sykes’ 10 yard touchdown run in the opening minutes of the third quarter made it 28–7, and the Cardinals led by at least 17 points the rest of the way. Lewis ran for 116 yards and three touchdowns and Davis passed for 265 yards and a touchdown.

Toledo

MiQuale Lewis rushed for 157 yards and two touchdowns and Ball State broke away from a close game at halftime to beat Toledo 31–0. Lewis carried the ball 31 times and scored on runs of three and one yards for the Cardinals. After taking the second half kickoff, Nate Davis led a 10 play, 74 yard drive that he capped with a one-yard touchdown run. Lewis then scored late in the quarter before the Cardinals added two more touchdowns in a two and a half minute span midway through the fourth quarter. Toledo lost its third straight home game for the first time in 15 years and was shut out by a Mid-American Conference opponent for the first time since 1985. The Rockets managed just 157 yards of total offense, rushing for 14 yards on 19 attempts. Davis completed 18 of 30 passes for 242 yards and Sykes added 90 yards on seven carries. After the victory, The Cardinals received enough votes to move into the Associated Press poll for the first time in school history, ranking at #25. It is also the first time the Cardinals started the season 6–0 since 1965.

Western Kentucky

Nate Davis threw for 155 yards and two touchdowns as Ball State overcame a slow start in its first ever game as a ranked team to beat Western Kentucky 24–7. Ball State led just 7–0 at halftime before eventually taking control in the third quarter. The Cardinals drove 64 yards during the opening drive of the second half, though it ended with Ian McGarvey missing a 21-yard field goal attempt. Afterwards, the Cardinals' defense forced Western Kentucky into a quick three and out. In the Cardinals' next offensive possession, Lewis ran up the middle of the field for 38 yards to set up a one-yard touchdown run that put the Cardinals up 14–0. McGarvey successfully kicked a 37-yard field goal to push the lead to 17–0, and after Western Kentucky failed on fourth down deep in its own territory, Davis completed a pass to Louis Johnson for a 20-yard touchdown with 6:31 remaining to put the game out of reach. The Hilltoppers garnered 352 yards of offense but turned the ball over three times and fell to 0–5 against Football Bowl Subdivision teams in the season. The Cardinals moved up one spot to #24 in the Associated Press poll and entered the USA Today coaches poll at #25, The Cardinals were the first Mid-American Conference team to appear in the coaches poll since Bowling Green in 2004. During their bye week, the Ball State Cardinals moved from #24 to #20 in the Associated Press poll and from #25 to #22 in the USA Today coaches poll. Ball State also debuted at #20 in the first BCS poll of the season.

Eastern Michigan

Nate Davis gave the Cardinals their first touchdown in the second quarter when he pitched the ball to Briggs Orsbon and sprinted toward the sideline, where Orsbon found him open for an easy four-yard catch into the end zone. In the third quarter, Davis completed a five-yard touchdown pass to Darius Hill and a six-yard touchdown pass to Orsbon. On the final play of the third quarter, Eastern Michigan's Andy Schmitt completed a seven-yard pass to Jacory Stone to give the Eagles their first points of the game. MiQuale Lewis, who came in with a streak of six straight games rushing for at least 100 yards, was held to 75 yards, but scored a 52-yard touchdown two plays into the fourth quarter. Trey Buice finished the rout for the Cardinals with a 45-yard interception return for a touchdown midway through the final quarter, and Ian McGarvey’s extra-point kick extended his school record to 48 in a row. Davis passed for 241 yards and Schmitt finished with a career-high 309 yards passing. Ball State's defense held the Eagles to 67 yards rushing and had two interceptions. With the victory, Ball State moved up two spots in the Associated Press poll to #18, up three spots to #19 in the USA Today coaches poll, and up four spots to #16 in the BCS poll. During their second bye week, the Cardinals' moved up two spots to #16 in the Associated Press poll and one spot to #18 in the USA Today coaches poll. However, the Cardinals moved down one spot to #17 in the BCS poll.

Northern Illinois

After forcing an early punt, defensive back Kiaree Daniels ran into Ball State's Chris Miller, drawing a 15-yard penalty to give a first down to the Cardinals'. Nate Davis responded by throwing a 33-yard pass to Briggs Orsbon at the Huskies' one-yard line. Two plays later, Miquale Lewis scored for a 7–0 lead. Midway through the second quarter, Davis completed a 33-yard pass to Louis Johnson. Then Davis threw his second touchdown pass to Darius Hill for a 14–0 lead. With 1:53 to go in the second quarter, Davis threw his third touchdown pass to Daniel Ifft for a 21–0 lead. Northern Illinois' Chandler Harnish opened the second half with a 25-yard touchdown run, but Lewis' 64 yard run on the ensuing drive set up a Davis one-yard touchdown run. Then, after a replay review reversed a 71-yard touchdown pass from Davis to Johnson, Davis went right back to Johnson for a 22-yard touchdown. Davis finished his night with a 20-yard touchdown pass to Hill early in the fourth quarter that made it 45–7. Davis completed 18 passes out of 22 for 300 yards and broke Mike Neu's career record for completions. Lewis ran 19 times and reached the 1,000 yard mark for the season, while Johnson caught six passes for 165 yards and a touchdown. Northern Illinois allowed nearly six times its per game average of 8.2 points. The Cardinals moved up two spots to #14 in the Associated Press poll, two spots in the USA Today coaches poll to #16, and three spots to #14 in the BCS poll after the victory over the Huskies.

Miami (OH)

Nate Davis threw for a touchdown and ran for another, and the Cardinals stayed unbeaten by wearing down the Miami RedHawks for a 31–16 victory. Ball State improved to 10–0 for the first time and matched their school record for victories. MiQuale Lewis had two one-yard touchdowns in the second half and finished with 165 yards, one short of his career high. He also caught two passes for 51 yards. For the third straight game, the Cardinals did not draw a penalty. Despite the victory, The Cardinals dropped three spots to #17 in the BCS Poll, but stayed in the same spot in the Associated Press and USA Today coaches poll.

Central Michigan

The win clinched a share of the Mid-American Conference West Division title for Ball State and set a school record for wins in a season. The win broke a streak of four consecutive losses to Central Michigan, which had won the past two division titles. The Cardinals went ahead with 7:29 left when Davis completed a pass to Briggs Orsbon in the corner of the end zone from 11 yards away. Central Michigan had a chance to tie it in the closing seconds, but Central Michigan quarterback Dan LeFevour was intercepted by Sean Baker with 27 seconds left. Davis completed 12 of 22 passes for 175 yards, including two touchdown passes to Louis Robinson. LeFevour completed 30 of 44 passes for 345 yards and two touchdowns, and added a team high 75 yards rushing on 24 carries. He became the fifth quarterback in Mid-American Conference history to pass 11,000 career yards in total offense. The game aired on ESPN2 and ranked as the most viewed and highest rated college football game ever for a Tuesday or Wednesday night on the network with a 1.6 Nielsen Rating. It also ranks as the Mid-American Conference’s most viewed regular season college football game ever on ESPN or ESPN2. The Cardinals moved up two spots from #17 to #15 in the BCS poll, up one to #15 in the USA Today coaches poll and dropped a spot to #15 in the Associated Press poll.

Western Michigan

MiQuale Lewis started the scoring in the game as he ran for a 10-yard touchdown run. On Ball State's next series, Davis completed a 40-yard touchdown pass to Lewis Johnson, whose "stop-and-go" move enabled him to elude two defenders. Western Michigan responded with a trick play, scoring when Tim Hiller threw a lateral to backup quarterback Drew Burdi, who turned and threw a 36-yard touchdown pass to Scneider Julien, making it 14–7. The Broncos tied it early in the second quarter on a pass from Hiller to Juan Nunez, who caught the nine-yard pass over his shoulder. The Cardinals broke the tie on a 43-yard field goal from Ian McGarvey and took a 24–14 halftime lead when Davis ran for a six-yard touchdown run. Lewis' one-yard touchdown run late in the third quarter and Trey Lewis' interception return made it 38–14. Western Michigan closed to 38–22 early in the fourth when Brandon West scored on an eight-yard touchdown run. But Lewis closed it out with a one-yard touchdown run with 4:31 to go, his twentieth rushing score of the season, which broke the previous record set by Mark Bornholdt in 1979. The Cardinals completed their first perfect regular season since 1949, their first undefeated season in Mid-American Conference play since 1978 and clinched a spot in the conference title game. The win gave Ball State its first Mid-American Conference West title in program history. A school record 11,088 students and 23,861 overall attended the game. The Cardinals moved up to #12 in the BCS and Associated Press poll and up to #13 in the USA Today coaches poll.

MAC Championship Game: Buffalo

The Cardinals fell into an early deficit when Buffalo quarterback Drew Willy completed a pass to Naam Roosevelt for a two-yard touchdown. The Cardinals responded midway through the second quarter as MiQuale Lewis ran for a four-yard touchdown. As the first half expired, Ian McGarvey kicked a 47-yard field goal to give the Cardinals a 10–7 lead. In the third quarter, Willy completed a 39-yard pass to Roosevelt to give the Bulls the lead 14–10. The Cardinals responded on the next drive, as Lewis concluded a seven-play, 65 yard drive with his second touchdown of the game, this time on a one-yard run to give the Cardinals the lead. After recovering a fumble, the Cardinals offense made it all the way to the Buffalo one-yard line, but a two-yard loss and a false start penalty pushed the ball back to the eight-yard line. On the next play, Nate Davis attempted to dive into the end zone, but fumbled the ball and was recovered by Buffalo's Mike Newton, who ran the ball back 92 yards for a touchdown. After getting to the Buffalo 15 yard line, the Cardinals fumbled for the third time and was run back for a 74-yard touchdown by Buffalo's Sherrod Lott for a 28–17 lead. The Cardinals fourth fumble of the game, which was forced and recovered by Buffalo’s Adekunle Akingba, set up Willy’s third touchdown pass to Roosevelt on an eight-yard completion to increase the lead to 35–17. The Cardinals cut the Buffalo lead back to 11 points with 4:17 remaining in the game after a 22-yard completion from Davis to Louis Johnson. Needing to get the ball back quickly, the Cardinals attempted an onside kick after the score, which was recovered by the Bulls. Buffalo then extended its lead to 18 points for a second time at 42–24, on a one-yard touchdown run by James Starks. An interception in the end zone with 41 seconds remaining in the game sealed the win for Buffalo. The game received a 1.7 Nielsen Rating, which set a Mid-American Conference record for the most viewers to ever watch a game involving two MAC teams on the ESPN family of networks. The Cardinals' fell to #23 in the Associated Press poll and to #22 in the USA Today and BCS poll.

GMAC Bowl

Tulsa took the early 7–0 lead over the Cardinals in the first quarter but Ball State answered back with an 18-yard touchdown run from Nate Davis. The Cardinals defense held Tulsa to a 30-yard field goal late in the first quarter but the Golden Hurricane went on to score with 10:39 remaining in the second quarter increasing their lead to 17–7. Robert Eddins blocked the first punt of his career and Jeremy Hill recovered the ball to give Ball State favorable field position, which resulted in a 40-yard field goal from Ian McGarvey with 6:36 left in the second quarter and closed Tulsa's lead to 17–10. Tulsa made its way down the field quickly to go ahead of the Cardinals 24–10 with 4:30 left in the second quarter on a 57-yard touchdown run.  With 29 seconds before the completion of the first half, McGarvey made a 22-yard field goal to close the gap to 24–13 at the break. During halftime, inclement weather conditions occurred with a heavy downpour which continued for the majority of the remainder of the game.  But the weather did not hamper the Golden Hurricane who opened the second half with a touchdown to take a 31–13 edge over Ball State.  Tulsa added another touchdown after Tarrion Adams scored his third touchdown of the game making it 38–13 with 13:29 remaining in the fourth quarter. The last touchdown scored was with 10:25 in the fourth when Tulsa completed a 13 ,yard pass to Jacob Frank making the score 45–13. The game marked the first time in school history Ball State has played in a bowl game in back-to-back season. With the loss, Ball State dropped out of the Associated Press and USA Today coaches poll.

Honors

Watchlists

Player of the week

Rankings

Statistics

Team

Scores by quarter

Offense

Rushing

Passing

Receiving

Defense

Special teams

Roster
70     Applegate, Jordan C    6-5    301    Jr.    Sr.       Fort Wayne, Ind. (Snider)

67    Arnold, Travis  OT  6-8  284  So.  Jr.  Fort Wayne, Ind. (Snider)

25    Baker, Sean  SS  6-1  205  Fr.  So.  Canfield, Ohio (Canfield)

16    Barajas, Blake  DB  6-0  195  Fr.  Fr.  Upland, Ind. (Eastbrook)

56    Barinaga, Gonzalo DT  6-2  256  Sr.  5Sr.  4L  Milwaukee, Wis. (Marquette)

34    Barker, Jeff  DE  6-5  215  Fr.  Fr.  Lowell, Ind. (Lowell)

27    Beane, Trent  WR  6-0  195  Fr.  Fr.  Bloomington, Ind. (North)

59    Beasley, Antonio SLB  6-0  219  Sr.  5Sr.  3L  Fort Wayne, Ind. (Northrop)

71    Brewster, Robert OT  6-5  310  Sr.  Sr.  4L  Cincinnati, Ohio (Wyoming)

11    Brown, Wendell  MLB  6-0  214  Sr.  5Sr.  4L  Detroit, Mich. (Martin Luther King)

30    Buckingham, John DE  6-1  221  So.  Jr.  Greenwood, Ind. (Center Grove)

8    Buice, Trey  CB  5-10  175  Sr.  Sr.  4L  Stone Mountain, Ga. (Tucker)

19    Burch, Koreen  CB  5-9  162  So.  So.  1L  Broxton, Ga. (Coffee)

20    Carnegie, Brandon  CB  5-11  183  So.  So.  1L  Novi, Mich. (Novi)

47    Choy, Brendan  TE  6-4  247  Fr.  So.  HS  Bradenton, Fla. (Lakewood Ranch)

58    Cole, Adam  OT  6-6  278  Sr.  5Sr.  2L  Eden Prairie, Minn. (Academy of Holy Angels)

31    Cook, Dane  FS  6-0  186  So.  Jr.  Eaton, Ind. (Delta)

51    Cornwell, Kyle  OG  6-4  272  Sr.  Sr.  4L  New Lenox, Ill. (Providence Catholic)

48    Cosby, Spain  MLB  5-11  212  Jr.  Jr.  2L  Carrollton, Ga. (Villa Rica)

24    Cravens, James  HB  5-11  210  Fr.  Fr.  HS  Centerville, Ohio (Centerville)

90    Crawford, Brandon  DE  6-3  260  Jr.  Sr.  2L  Fort Wayne, Ind. (South)

69    Davis, Chad  OL  6-3  263  Jr.  Sr.  HS  Pendleton, Ind. (Pendleton Heights)

13    Davis, Nate  QB  6-2  217  Jr.  Jr.  2L  Bellaire, Ohio (Bellaire)

28    Dawson, Andre  WR  6-0  172  Fr.  Fr.  Lewis Center, Ohio (Olentangy)

65    Duffin, Drew  DT  6-3  255  Jr.  Sr.  2L  Avon, Ind. (Avon)

91    Eddins, Robert  DE  6-3  224  So.  Jr.  1L  Detroit, Mich. (Crockett)

2    Edmonds, Frank  HB  5-8  181  So.  So.  1L  Cleveland, Ohio (St. Edward)

78    Gall, Kevin  OT  6-5  245  Fr.  So.  Granger, Ind. (Penn)

14    Garner, Perci  QB  6-1  222  So.  So.  HS  Dover, Ohio (Dover)

52    Gerberry, Dan  C  6-3  292  Sr.  5Sr.  3L  Austintown, Ohio (Austintown Fitch)

80    Gibson, Torieal  WR  5-9  165  Fr.  Fr.  HS Cleveland, Ohio (Glenville)

82    Grant, Madaris  TE  6-5  222  Jr.  Sr.  2L  Cincinnati, Ohio (Mount Healthy)

54    Gray, Jerrod  NT  6-3  253  Fr.  So.  HS  Bradley, Ill. (Bourbonnais)

15    Gregory, Jakeem CB  5-9  170  So.  Jr.  Fort Wayne, Ind. (Snider)

49    Haines, Bryant  WLB  6-5  223  Sr.  5Sr.  4L  Piqua, Ohio (Piqua)

44    Hartke, Ryan  SLB  6-4  200  Fr.  So.  St. Henry, Ohio (St. Henry)

15    Hemm, Justin  QB  5-11  185  Fr.  Fr.  HS  Piqua, Ohio (Piqua)

6    Henry, Derrick  FS  6-1  189  So.  So.  1L  Columbus, Ohio (Worthington Kilbourne)

3    Hill, B.J.  CB  5-7  180  Sr.  Sr.  4L  Lanham, Md. (Riverdale Baptist)

88    Hill, Darius  TE  6-6  236  Sr.  5Sr.  4L  Blue Springs, Mo. (Blue Springs)

83    Hill, Jeremy  WR  6-2  175  Fr.  Fr.  Marietta, Ga (Marietta)

29    Hogue, Jake  PK  5-9  195  So.  Jr.  1L  Plainfield, Ind. (Plainfield)

23    Hoke, Kyle  S  5-11  190  Fr.  Fr.  HS  Sugar Land, Texas (Clements)

77    Holtz, Austin  OL  6-5  290  Fr.  Fr.  Holt, Mich. (Holt)

97    Houston, Jermaine DE  6-4  241  Sr.  5Sr.  Newberry, S.C. (Newberry)

46    Howard, Joshua  FS  6-1  190  Fr.  Fr.  Inkster, Mich. (Inkster)

18    Hunt, Michael  HB  5-6  170  So.  Jr.  South Bend, Ind. (Riley)

66    Hunter, Kreg  OL  6-3  284  Fr.  So.  Lebanon, Ind. (Lebanon)

4    Ifft, Daniel  WR  6-3  181  So.  So.  2L  Dover, Ohio (Dover)

57    Jacoby, Ben  C  6-2  263  Fr.  So.  Lawrenceville, Ga. (Buford)

96    Jankowski, Jason DT  6-2  262  So.  Jr.  Heartland, Wis. (Arrowhead)

81    Johnson, Louis  WR  6-1  177  Sr.  5Sr.  4L  Muncie, Ind. (Central)

42    Jones, Davyd  MLB  6-1  200  So.  So.  2L  Muncie, Ind. (Central)

18    Jordan, Zac  FS  5-10  196  Fr.  So.  Cincinnati, Ohio (Elder)

17    Justice, Tanner QB  6-3  196  Jr.  Sr.  Indianapolis, Ind. (Cathedral)

41    Keller, Sean  DB  5-10  185  So.  Jr.  Malnerville, Ohio (Kings)

76    Kennedy, Rayondon OL  6-2  259  Fr.  So.  Dolton, Ill. (Mount Carmel)

43    Kilburn, Tad  FS  6-0  182  So.  Jr.  Middletown, Ohio (Monroe)

28    King, Aaron  HB  5-10  200  Fr.  Fr.  HS  Saratoga Springs, NY (Carmel)

38    Knipp, Alex  SS  6-0  194  Jr.  Jr.  2L  Amherst, Ohio (Steele)

18    Kovanda, Scott  P  6-3  190  Fr.  Fr.  HS  Hartland, Mich. (Detroit Catholic Central)

9    Kuntz, Kyle  SS  5-10  193  Jr.  Sr.  Vandalia, Ohio (Butler)

33    Lewis, MiQuale  HB  5-6  184  Jr.  Jr.  2L  Fort Wayne, Ind. (Snider)

12    Lewis, Trey  CB  6-0  190  Sr.  5Sr.  4L  Raleigh, N.C. (Ravenscroft)

72    Lowry, Cameron  OT  6-6  255  Fr.  Fr.  HS  Indianapolis, Ind. (Pike)

94    Manick, Dan  DL  6-4  265  Fr.  Fr.  HS  Dyer, Ind. (Lake Central)

26    McGarvey, Ian  PK/P  5-9  210  So.  So.  2L  Greenwood, Ind. (Center Grove)

99    Meeks, Kenny  SLB  6-2  230  Sr.  5Sr.  4L  Muncie, Ind. (Central)

35    Miller, Chris  P  6-2  211  Sr.  5Sr.  4L  Liberty, Ill. (Carmel)

93    Morris, Adam  OL  6-0  305  Fr.  Fr.  HS  Dublin, Ohio (Scioto)

53    Muhlenkamp, Cody LS  5-11  203  So.  Jr.  2L Coldwater, Ohio (Coldwater)

68    Myers, Devin  OT  6-5  260  Fr.  Fr.  HS  Westfield, Ind. (Westfield)

16    Orsbon, Briggs  WR  6-0  185  Fr.  Fr.  HS  Convoy, Ohio (Crestview)

21    Overton, Wade  WR  6-3  200  Sr.  5Sr.  1L  Indianapolis, Ind. (Lawrence North)

5    Page, Kelly  QB  6-3  210  Fr.  Fr.  HS  Sunnyvale, Texas (Mesquite)

95    Perry, Rene  NT  5-11  271  So.  So.  2L  Lake City, Fla. (Columbia)

44    Pettit, Kyle  CB  6-2  180  Fr.  Fr.  HS  Sunman, Ind. (East Central)

92    Pitcock, Jafe  NT  6-2  262  Fr.  So.  Piqua, Ohio (Piqua)

41    Puthoff, Andrew DT  6-3  254  Fr.  So.  St. Henry, Ohio (St. Henry)

79    Ramsey, Andre  OT  6-5  304  Sr.  Sr.  4L  Cordele, Ga. (Crisp County)

36    Rolf, Pete  DE  6-4  246  Fr.  So.  HS  Salt Lake City, Utah (Piqua)

15    Scheidt, Reid  SS  6-2  195  So.  Jr.  Lake Village, Ind. (North Newton)

14    Schott, Steven  PK  6-1  165  Fr.  Fr.  HS  Massillon, Ohio (Washington)

84    Sharick, Drew  TE  6-6  230  Fr.  So.  Champaign, Ill. (Central)

74    Switzer, Michael OL  6-5  277  So.  So.  2L Indianapolis, Ind. (Lawrence North)

7    Sykes, Cory  HB  5-7  155  Fr.  Fr.  HS  Harvey, Ill. (Thornton)

87    Trempe, Myles  WR  6-4  202  So.  Jr.  1L  Springfield, Ohio (St. Paris Graham)

98    Warmoth, Ryan  DB  6-1  205  Fr.  Fr.  HS  Mishawaka, Ind. (Mishawaka)

37    White, Rashaad  HB  5-9  205  Fr.  Fr.  HS  Rex, Ga. (Stockbridge)

28    Winkler, Ray  HB  5-9  182  So.  So.  South Bend, Ind. (St. Joseph's)

32    Womack, Lorren  WLB  6-0  221  Fr.  So.  Huber Heights, Ohio (Wayne)

85    Woodard, Justin DE  6-3  222  So.  Jr.  1L  LaGrange, Ga. (Troup County)

64    Woods, Kaylon  DT  6-2  254  So.  Jr.  Jacksonville, Fla. (First Coast)

55    Woodworth, Sam  WLB  6-2  202  Jr.  Sr.  Elkhart, Ind. (Central)

63    Yoder, Steve  OL  6-3  300  Fr.  Fr.  HS  Canal Fulton, Ohio (Massillon Washington)

References

Ball State
Ball State Cardinals football seasons
Ball State Cardinals football